William Tapley Bennett Jr. (April 1, 1917 – November 29, 1994) was an American diplomat who served as Ambassador to the Dominican Republic during the 1965 civil war and who recommended that President Johnson intervene with United States troops.

Early life
Bennett was born in Griffin, Georgia on April 1, 1917.  He was the only child of William Tapley Bennett Sr. (1891–1982) and Annie Mem (née Little) Bennett (1894–1965).

His maternal grandparents were Peyton Brantley "Mem" Little and Julia Elizabeth (née Neal) Little.

Bennett attended the University of Georgia where he was a member of the Sigma Chi fraternity.  After doing graduate work at the University of Freiburg in Germany from 1937 to 1938, he returned to the United States and earned a law degree from George Washington University Law School.

Career
After graduation from law school, Bennett joined the Foreign Service in 1941. He served as a United States Army intelligence officer during World War II.  From 1951 to 1954, Bennett was Deputy Director to the Office of South American Affairs.  From 1954 to 1955, he studied at the National War College and for two years after, he served as Special Assistant to the Under Secretary of State for Political Affairs. From 1957 to 1964, he acted as Counselor and Minister at the U.S. Embassies in Rome, Italy, in Vienna, Austria, and in Athens, Greece.

President Lyndon Johnson appointed him Ambassador to the Dominican Republic after the previous Ambassador, John Bartlow Martin, resigned after the Kennedy assassination on the very day in which Juan Bosch, then President of the Dominican Republic, was toppled in a coup d'etat.  While Ambassador, Bennett "advised President Johnson and members of Congress that the revolt was led by Communists" and recommended President Johnson intervene with United States troops during the Dominican Civil War.  Bennett was heavily criticized for his report and recommendation.

Reportedly "seeking relief from the tropical heat of the Dominican Republic," Johnson appointed him the Ambassador to Portugal in 1966.  He served in that role until Richard Nixon became president in 1969 and he was succeeded by Ridgway B. Knight, who up until that point was the Ambassador to Belgium.

Beginning in 1972, he began to serve concurrently as Ambassador to the United Nations Security Council and Deputy United States Representative to the United Nations.  After Jimmy Carter became president in 1977, Bennett was appointed the United States Permanent Representative to NATO, serving from 1977 through 1983, including when Ronald Reagan became president in 1981.

On November 14, 1983 he was appointed Assistant Secretary of State for Legislative Affairs, serving from November 17, 1983 to January 4, 1985.

Later career
After retiring in 1985 he served as adjunct professor of international law at the University of Georgia.  From 1991 to 1992, he served as president of the Atlantic Treaty Association.

Personal life
On June 23, 1945, Bennett was married to Margaret Rutherfurd White in Bernardsville, New Jersey.  Margaret, a Foxcroft School graduate who attended Barnard College and the Institute of Musical Art of the Juilliard School of Music, was the daughter of John Campbell White (the U.S. Ambassador to Peru and Haiti), a granddaughter of Henry White (the U.S. Ambassador to France and Italy), and a niece of Jay Pierrepont Moffat, the U.S. Ambassador to Canada. Together, they were the parents of five children:

 William Tapley Bennett III of Washington, D.C.
 John Campbell White Bennett of Charleston, South Carolina, a U.S. Navy Cmdr.
 Anne B. Bennett of Lexington, Massachusetts
 Ellen Pierrepont Bennett, who married Rev. Ralph C. Godsall, the Chaplain of Trinity College, Cambridge, in 1980.
 Victoria R. Bennett of Seattle, Washington.

He died after a long illness in Washington D.C. on November 29, 1994.

References

External links
 William Tapley Bennett, Jr. Papers 
 
 

1917 births
1994 deaths
People from Griffin, Georgia
Permanent Representatives of the United States to NATO
Ambassadors of the United States to the Dominican Republic
Ambassadors of the United States to Portugal
George Washington University Law School alumni
University of Georgia faculty
United States Foreign Service personnel